The Olympic sailing classes have been used in the sport of Sailing/Yachting during the Olympic Summer Games since 1896. Since then, 46 different classes have been used.

History
Over a period of more than 112 years, in a sport that uses complex technical equipment, classes will be discontinued for use at the Olympics. Reasons for discontinuation of a class varied from economical, logistical and technological to emotional and even political. Some of the discontinued classes remain very strong International - or National classes. Others filled a niche in a specific area like sailing schools or local club racing. Some faded away.

The "Former Olympic Sailing Classes", together with their crews form an important and significant part of the history of sailing in general and Olympic Sailing in particular. These tables give an overview of the classes and when they were used for Olympic sailing.

Current Olympic Classes

Discontinued Olympic Classes

Pre-WWII games (1900–1936)

Post-WWII games (1948—2020)

Legend
 ( •  ) Open Class event (Male and Female)
 ( M  ) Male event
 ( F  ) Female event
 ( Fm ) Female Matchrace event
 ( Of ) Open with a minimum of one female
 ( C  ) Combined open event (Fleetrace and Matchrace)
 ( Mix  ) Mixed (e.g. One Male & One Female Crew)
 ( H  ) Heavyweight Dinghy event
 ( P  ) High Performance Dinghy event
 ( VIP ) Vintage Inter Pares event (sailoff between the winners of each Vintage Yachting event)

See also

Sailing at the Summer Olympics
Sailboarding at the Olympics
ISAF Sailing World Championships
International Sailing Federation
Vintage Yachting Games

References
 International Sailing Federation

External links

 
sailing classes